Enlightenment is the twentieth studio album by Northern Irish singer-songwriter Van Morrison.  It was released in 1990 and reached No. 5 in the UK charts and "Real Real Gone" charted at No. 18 in Mainstream Rock Tracks.

The June 2008 re-issued and re-mastered version of the album contains alternative takes of  "Enlightenment" and "So Quiet in Here". "Start All Over Again" from this album was listed as one of the standout tracks from the six album reissue.

Recording
The album was recorded in London, England, and Real World in Box.  The arrangements were by Fiachra Trench and Micheal O'Suilleabhain played piano with a brass section made up of British jazz musicians from the late sixties: Frank Ricotti, Henry Lowther and Malcolm Griffiths.
One of the songs "So Quiet in Here" was recorded at the Kirk, Rode, Somerset, a setting which served as both church or studio.

Composition
The song "Enlightenment" contains the words: "I'm in the here and now and I'm meditating/ And still I'm suffering but that's my problem/ Enlightenment, don't know what it is".  "So Quiet in Here" is  a continuation of the song "Into the Mystic" from the Moondance album.  The single released from the album, "Real Real Gone", was originally written and meant for the 1980 album Common One. The song "In the Days Before Rock 'N' Roll" was a collaboration between Morrison and the Irish poet Paul Durcan.

Track listing
All songs by Morrison unless noted otherwise.

"Real Real Gone" – 3:43
"Enlightenment" – 4:04
"So Quiet in Here" – 6:09
"Avalon of the Heart" – 4:45
"See Me Through" – 6:13
"Youth of 1,000 Summers" – 3:45
"In the Days Before Rock 'N' Roll" (Durcan, Morrison) – 8:13
"Start All Over Again" – 4:10
"She's My Baby" – 5:14
"Memories" – 4:14

Bonus tracks (2008 CD reissue)
"Enlightenment" – 3:29 (alternative take)
"So Quiet in Here" – 4:03 (alternative take)

Personnel

Musicians

Van Morrison – vocals, guitar, harmonica
The Ambrosian Singers – choir, with John McCarthy as choirmaster (on 4)
Dave Bishop – soprano and baritone saxophones
Paul Durcan – spoken word (on 7)
Dave Early – drums (except on 4, 10)
Georgie Fame – electric piano, hammond organ, backing vocals
Alex Gifford – synthesizers, piano
Steve Gregory – tenor saxophone, flute
Malcolm Griffiths – trombone
Bernie Holland – lead guitar (on 2, 6, 9)
Henry Lowther – trumpet (on 6, 8, 9)
Brian Odgers – bass guitar (on 2, 9)
Mícheál Ó Súilleabháin – piano (on 3)
Steve Pearce – bass guitar (except on 2, 9)
Frank Ricotti – vibraphone (on 8)
Steve Sanger – drums (on 4, 10)
Steve Waterman – flugelhorn (on 6, 8, 9)

Production
Recorded mainly at Wool Hall Studios, Beckington
Townhouse, London, Real World, Box and 
Pavilion Studios, London.
("So Quiet in Here" recorded at The Kirk, Rode, Somerset)
Producer: Van Morrison
Engineers: Mick Glossop, Steve Williams
Additional engineering: Alastair McMillan
Mixing: Mick Glossop, Steve Williams
String, Brass and Choir arrangements: Fiachra Trench
String section leader: Gavin Wright
Keyboard and Synth arrangements: Neil Drinkwater

Charts

Album
UK Album Chart

Billboard (North America)

Singles
Billboard

Notes

References
Hinton, Brian (1997). Celtic Crossroads: The Art of Van Morrison, Sanctuary,

External links
Van Morrison's Enlightenment  another sign of transition

Van Morrison albums
1990 albums
Mercury Records albums
Albums produced by Van Morrison